Gandeeville is an unincorporated community in Roane County, West Virginia, United States. Gandeeville has a post office with ZIP code 25243.

The community derives its name from Uriah Gandee, a pioneer settler.

References

Unincorporated communities in Roane County, West Virginia
Unincorporated communities in West Virginia